This article presents a timeline of events in the history of the United Kingdom from 1970 until 1989. For a narrative explaining the overall developments, see the related history of the British Isles. For narratives about this time period, see Postwar Britain (1945–1979), Social history of Postwar Britain (1945–1979), Political history of the United Kingdom (1979–present) and Social history of the United Kingdom (1979–present)



United Kingdom

England

Scotland

Wales

See also
 History of England
 History of Northern Ireland
 History of Scotland
 History of Wales
 History of the United Kingdom

British history timelines